December 24 - Eastern Orthodox liturgical calendar - December 26

All fixed commemorations below are observed on January 7 by Eastern Orthodox Churches on Old Calendar.

For December 25th, Orthodox Churches on the Old Calendar commemorate the Saints listed on December 12.

Feasts
 The Nativity, according to the Flesh of our Lord, God and Savior Jesus Christ:
 The Adoration of the Magi:
 Melchior, Gaspar, and Balthasar.
 Commemoration of the shepherds in Bethlehem who were watching their flocks and came to see the Lord:
 Annunciation to the shepherds; and Adoration of the shepherds.

Pre-Schism Western saints
 Saint Eugenia of Rome (c. 258)  (see also December 24 - East )
 Saint Anastasia of Sirmium (c. 304)   (see also December 22 - East )
 Saint Æthelburh of Wilton (Alburgh, Alburga), a member of the royal house of Wessex, Abbess of Wilton Abbey and a saint (810)

Post-Schism Orthodox saints
 Massacre of Monk-martyr Jonah, and with him 50 monks and 65 laymen, martyrs at St. Tryphon of Pechenga Monastery, by the Swedes (1589)  (see also: December 15 )

New martyrs and confessors
 New Hieromartyr Michael, Priest (1930)

Icon gallery

Notes

References

Sources
 December 25/January 7. Orthodox Calendar (PRAVOSLAVIE.RU).
 January 7 / December 25. HOLY TRINITY RUSSIAN ORTHODOX CHURCH (A parish of the Patriarchate of Moscow).
 December 25. OCA - The Lives of the Saints.
 The Autonomous Orthodox Metropolia of Western Europe and the Americas (ROCOR). St. Hilarion Calendar of Saints for the year of our Lord 2004. St. Hilarion Press (Austin, TX). p. 2.
 December 25. Latin Saints of the Orthodox Patriarchate of Rome.
 The Roman Martyrology. Transl. by the Archbishop of Baltimore. Last Edition, According to the Copy Printed at Rome in 1914. Revised Edition, with the Imprimatur of His Eminence Cardinal Gibbons. Baltimore: John Murphy Company, 1916. pp. 395–397.
Greek Sources
 Great Synaxaristes:  25 ΔΕΚΕΜΒΡΙΟΥ. ΜΕΓΑΣ ΣΥΝΑΞΑΡΙΣΤΗΣ.
  Συναξαριστής. 25 Δεκεμβρίου. ECCLESIA.GR. (H ΕΚΚΛΗΣΙΑ ΤΗΣ ΕΛΛΑΔΟΣ). 
Russian Sources
  7 января (25 декабря). Православная Энциклопедия под редакцией Патриарха Московского и всея Руси Кирилла (электронная версия). (Orthodox Encyclopedia - Pravenc.ru).
  25 декабря (ст.ст.) 7 января 2013 (нов. ст.). Русская Православная Церковь Отдел внешних церковных связей. (DECR).

December in the Eastern Orthodox calendar
Nativity of Jesus in worship and liturgy